Tim Yeung (born November 27, 1978) is an American extreme metal drummer. He currently performs in the band I Am Morbid, which plays Morbid Angel songs and also features Morbid Angel's former vocalist/bassist David Vincent.

Biography
Yeung attended Hochstein School of Music & Dance in Rochester, New York and graduated in 1995. He was first introduced to the death metal genre in the 1980s. His breakout performance was in 1999 on Hate Eternal's debut album Conquering the Throne, after which he became a big name in the death metal scene. Although Yeung left Hate Eternal after the release of Conquering the Throne, he started lending his talents as a live session drummer, such as with American metalcore band All That Remains,  death metal bands Vital Remains and Nile, and as a studio drummer on ...And Time Begins by Decrepit Birth. 

Yeung was the drummer and co-founder of the death metal/metalcore band Divine Heresy and can be heard on their debut album, Bleed the Fifth and their second studio album, Bringer of Plagues. He was also the drummer of World Under Blood, CKY frontman Deron Miller's death metal side project. He replaced Pete Sandoval in Morbid Angel for their 2011 album Illud Divinum Insanus due to Sandoval's back surgery and was their official drummer until June 2015.

In 2006, Yeung hit 872 bass drum hits in one minute at a World's Fastest Drummer competition, which earned him the Fastest Feet Title for that event, though not the world record, which clocked in at 1034 hits in one minute, held by Canadian drummer Mike Mallais. By Yeung's standards, 872 hits in a minute is comparatively low, translating to one minute of 16th notes at 218 BPM, which is considerably slower than the speeds he has displayed in his group work, which he has been said to get to speeds of around just over 247 BPM. Yeung has stated in interviews that he could have played much faster if he had been using his own setup.

Although he is best known as a drummer for death metal bands such as Hate Eternal and Decrepit Birth, Yeung has stated that he has diverse tastes. In the January 2008 issue of Drum! magazine, Yeung states "...if it has a good drummer then it's good music." His straddling of the extreme and mainstream is perhaps best reflected in his work with Divine Heresy, whose music features elements of extreme death metal as well as genres such as metalcore (from Tommy Vext's vocals) and industrial metal (from Dino Cazares' guitar work).

Equipment
Yeung uses and endorses ddrum drums, Sabian cymbals, Axis pedals and Vic Firth drumsticks.

Setup
Drums – ddrum Dominion Maple, Black Gloss finish
22×20 Bass Drum (×2)
10×7 Tom
12×8 Tom
13×9 Tom
14×13 Tom
16×14 Floor Tom
14×6.5 Tim Yeung Signature Detonator Snare Drum
Cymbals – Sabian 
14" AAX Metal Hi-Hats
14" AA Mini Chinese
18" B8 Pro Chinese
18" AAX Stage Crash
8" AAX Splash
18" AAX Studio Crash
19" AAX X-Treme Chinese
22" HH Power Bell Ride
12" AA Mini Hat stacked on a 14" AAX Mini Chinese
20" APX Crash
Hardware
Axis Longboards A Classic Black Pedals (×2)
Other
Vic Firth Extreme 5A Nylon Drumsticks

References

American heavy metal musicians
American heavy metal drummers
Death metal musicians
Musicians from Rochester, New York
1978 births
Living people
20th-century American drummers
American male drummers
Hate Eternal members
All That Remains (band) members
Pestilence (band) members
Assjack members
21st-century American drummers
20th-century American male musicians
21st-century American male musicians